Wake Up to Money is an early morning financial radio programme on BBC Radio 5 Live. It is broadcast from 05:00 to 06:00 each weekday.

History
The programme was established when Radio 5 Live began broadcasting in March 1994. It has been produced by the Business Programmes section of BBC Radio which produces for Radio 4 and 5 Live in the Business and Economics Unit. It began as a fifteen-minute programme, starting at 05:45, as part of the Morning Reports programme. It became a programme in its own right on 29 April 2002, starting at 05:30. The format was updated in early 2014: the broadcast time was extended to 45 minutes with the show starting at 05:15. It was extended again in 2020 and now occupies the full hour between 05:00 and 06:00. 

Until 2020, the programme was hosted by a main presenter with a co-presenter, who would provide the shares news on the FTSE 100 Index, the commodities prices and currencies' markets, and specialise more in companies' financial performance, history, and corporate structure. Mickey Clark was the longest serving co-presenter, from March 1994 until February 2020, when the programme was changed to a single presenter format. The main presenter is Sean Farrington.

Content

The show has a broad scope; covering a wide range of business, economics, finance and technology stories. There is a focus on UK domestic business news, but major international stories are also covered. There is a BBC reporter based in Singapore, who gives updates on the global financial markets. There is an element of (cheeky sarcasm) humour to the programme.

Interviewees are invited to take part in live discussions on the programme. Guests range from company executives, academic experts and business professionals to general members of the public. 

Expert guests are often from industry trade groups, such as the CBI, IoD, FSB, university business schools, or watchdogs.

There is also a regular UK markets guest poised to discuss company, commodities or currencies news, and to comment on any breaking business stories. These contributors are often based in the City of London. Frequent guests have included David Buik, and Justin Urquhart Stewart of Seven Investment Management.

In 2008/09, the banks featured heavily; rarely had a programme not mentioned the state of the UK banks or the Financial Services Authority.

From 2016-2020, Brexit was covered regularly, and since mid-March 2020, the impact of COVID-19 on British businesses and the UK economy has often led the programme's news agenda.

Broadcasts
The programme is also carried by Radio Scotland, Radio Ulster, and Radio Foyle. After transmission, the show is uploaded as a podcast on BBC Sounds.

Former presenters
 Adrian Chiles - from March 1994, until the mid-1990s. He later married the co-presenter of the Morning Reports programme, Jane Garvey
Mickey Clark - from March 1994, until February 2020.
 Philippa Lamb - followed Adrian Chiles and later went on to present 5 Live's Moneycheck and Radio 4's Nice Work
 Declan Curry - from the mid-1990s until 1997
 Pauline McCole - regular stand-in presenter since 2001 
 Simon Jack - presents business for Today
 Paul Lewis - from August 1997 until 11 August 2000
 Guy Ruddle - from 2000 until December 2005, later made podcasts for The Telegraph
 Adam Shaw
 Andrew Verity
 Adam Parsons
 Jeremy Naylor
 Rob Young
 Adam Kirtley - regular stand in presenter 2012-14

See also
 Working Lunch - finished at the end of July 2010
 Squawk Box Europe
 Money Box
 Financial World Tonight (former series)
 :Category:Economy of the United Kingdom

References

External links

Audio clips
 Wake up to Money BBC Radio 5 with ercol's Nick Garratt YouTube - Furniture manufacturing in September 2009
 Plastics 2020 Challenge - BBC Radio 5 Wake Up to Money 7 July  YouTube - Plastics industry in August 2009
 5 Live Wake Up To Money 31 July 2009 YouTube - 0870 numbers in July 2009

1994 radio programme debuts
BBC Radio 5 Live programmes
Business and finance podcasts
Radio programs about economics
Business mass media in the United Kingdom
Audio podcasts